Sébastien Olivier Bourdais (born 28 February 1979) is a French professional racing driver.

He is one of the most successful drivers in the history of American open-wheel car racing, having won 37 races. He won four successive championships under Champ Car World Series sanction from 2004 to 2007. Later he competed at the IndyCar Series from 2011 to 2021.

Bourdais has raced sports cars throughout his career, with spells at the Rolex Sports Car Series, American Le Mans Series, Le Mans Series, Intercontinental Le Mans Cup, FIA World Endurance Championship, and currently the IMSA WeatherTech SportsCar Championship. He was a Peugeot Sport factory driver from 2007 to 2011, finishing runner-up three times at his home race, the 24 Hours of Le Mans. The Frenchman was a Ford Performance factory driver from 2016 to 2019, winning the GTE-Pro class at the 2016 24 Hours of Le Mans. He became a Cadillac factory driver in 2022.

Early years

Karting
Born into a racing family in Le Mans (his father Patrick raced in touring cars, hill climbs and sports cars), Bourdais began his racing career at age 10 in karts. During the early 1990s, he competed in a variety of karting championships, winning the Maine Bretagne League in 1991 and the Cadet France championship in 1993. Bourdais was part of the winning Sologne Karting team which won the 1996 24-hour Le Mans kart race at the Circuit Alain Prost on a Merlin chassis with Atomic motors.

Junior formulae
Bourdais progressed to single-seater racing in 1995, finishing 9th in the Formula Campus by Renault and Elf Championship. He then spent two years in the French Formula Renault Championship, ultimately finishing second in points in 1997 after winning four races and five pole positions. In 1998, he won five races to become Rookie of the Year (6th overall) in French F3. He won the series outright in 1999, with eight wins and three poles.

Formula 3000
Following his success in the lower formulae, Bourdais joined the Prost Junior Team in the International F3000 Championship. He finished ninth in the series with one pole and a best finish of second. In 2001, Bourdais moved to the DAMS team in Formula 3000 and took his first win in the series at Silverstone. He changed teams again for 2002, taking his Super Nova Racing car to three victories and seven pole positions. He beat Giorgio Pantano to the championship by two points after Tomáš Enge, who had scored the most points, was penalised for failing a drug test.

DTM
After his Formula 3000 career and with no prospects for graduation to Formula 1, Bourdais signed with Opel to race in the DTM in 2003. His manager, David Sears, inserted a clause in his contract which allowed him to break his contract without penalties in the event that he managed to secure a drive in Formula 1, CART or the Indy Racing League. Bourdais tested for Opel but did not drive in a DTM race because he managed to secure a drive in CART for 2003. Bourdais was to be paid €250,000 for his 2003 season with Opel.

Champ Car career

Following in the footsteps of recent F3000 graduates such as Juan Pablo Montoya and Bruno Junqueira, Bourdais moved to Champ Car racing in the United States and joined Newman/Haas Racing for the 2003 CART season. At St. Petersburg, Florida, Bourdais became the first rookie since Nigel Mansell to claim pole position for his very first race. However, he did not finish higher than 11th until his fourth race, when he led 95 laps en route to his first Champ Car victory at Brands Hatch.

He followed this up with another victory at the Lausitzring. By the end of the season, he had earned five more podium finishes, including a win from the pole at Cleveland. With a runner-up finish in Mexico City, he clinched the Rookie of the Year title and finished 4th in the overall standings.

Bourdais was paid US $70,000 to drive for Newman/Haas Racing in 2003.

Staying with Newman-Haas for 2004, Bourdais dominated the Champ Car series with seven wins and eight poles in his McDonald's-sponsored Lola, beating his teammate Junqueira by 28 points. His record also included podium finishes in 10 out of 14 events and qualifying results no lower than third all season.

Bourdais successfully defended his Champ Car title in 2005 with five wins in six races towards the end of the season, again with the Newman-Haas/Lanigan team. That May, he also finished 12th in his first Indianapolis 500.

Bourdais won a third consecutive Champ Car title in 2006. His season began with four consecutive victories at Long Beach, Houston, Monterrey, and Milwaukee, although his winning streak was ended by the emergence of A. J. Allmendinger, who won three races in a row through the middle of the season. Bourdais responded with a commanding victory from pole at San Jose, leaving him leading the Champ Car points standings.

However, an incident with his arch-rival Paul Tracy that knocked him out on the final lap of the following race in Denver, and a subsequent win by Allmendinger narrowed the gap between the two. Bourdais's win in Montreal and Allmendinger's DNF had widened his points lead to 62 points with three races left, and Bourdais clinched the championship at the next race in Surfers Paradise despite a weak performance in that race. Bourdais became the first Champ Car driver to win three consecutive titles since Ted Horn achieved the hat trick in 1948.

Bourdais won a fourth consecutive Champ Car title in 2007 with victory at Lexmark Indy 300 on 21 October.

Formula One career

Pre-champ car
In 2002, Bourdais got his first F1 test with the Arrows team and was signed on to drive for the team but the team was on the verge of bankruptcy. In December he tested for Renault at Jerez but fellow Frenchman Franck Montagny secured the test drive instead of Bourdais.

Toro Rosso

Bourdais returned to F1 in 2007 after being given several tests with Scuderia Toro Rosso. On 10 August 2007 it was announced Bourdais would replace Vitantonio Liuzzi at Red Bull's b-team, Toro Rosso, as team-mate to Sebastian Vettel. On 16 March 2008 Bourdais competed in his first Formula One Championship race, the 2008 Australian Grand Prix in Melbourne. After qualifying in 17th position he took advantage of mistakes made by other drivers, in the first Formula One race since the 2001 San Marino Grand Prix without traction control, and worked his way up to fourth. However, with three laps remaining an engine problem forced Bourdais to retire, but he was still classified 8th having completed more than 90% of the race distance. He later inherited seventh place (and two Championship points) after the disqualification of Rubens Barrichello.

Bourdais qualified ninth for the Belgian Grand Prix. During the race he quickly gained places and held on to fifth place for much of the distance, getting as high as 3rd and was on course for a podium position. As the rain fell harder on the last lap he was overtaken by several cars on wet tyres and finished 7th. After the race, an emotional Bourdais was close to tears following the result. This marked his best weekend of the season and his first World Championship points since Melbourne.

Bourdais qualified in fourth place for the 2008 Italian Grand Prix. However, his car would not select first gear on the grid and had to start from the pit lane, a lap down (as the race started behind the safety car, there was no warm-up lap). Although he eventually finished a lap behind the race winner, team-mate Vettel, he set the second-fastest lap of the race; only Ferrari's Kimi Räikkönen went faster. At the 2008 Japanese Grand Prix he was 6th on the road but received a 25-second penalty for causing an avoidable accident with Felipe Massa dropping him to 10th. Few agreed with the decision – ITV Sport's Martin Brundle had stated during live TV coverage of the race that he felt Massa might receive a penalty, whilst his colleague James Allen stated that 99% of experts he spoke to felt that Bourdais did not deserve a penalty; the FIA were under such public scrutiny at the time following a string of controversial decisions that they made the unprecedented step of releasing publicly "stewards only" footage of the incident, to justify the decision.

Bourdais tested significantly for the Toro Rosso team during the winter, though he was uncertain of a drive heading into the new year. On 6 February 2009 however he was confirmed as a Toro Rosso driver for a second year, partnering Swiss rookie Sébastien Buemi. Despite two points finishes in the year at the Australian Grand Prix and in Monaco, Bourdais struggled to match his less experienced team-mate. In Spain Bourdais struck Buemi's car as the field attempted to avoid a spun Jarno Trulli on the first lap, ending the race for both drivers. At the British Grand Prix Bourdais collided with McLaren driver Heikki Kovalainen, again ending the race for both. At the German Grand Prix he suffered a mechanical failure after qualifying last by over a second.

On 16 July 2009, Toro Rosso announced that Bourdais would no longer be driving for the team. Toro Rosso's Franz Tost said the partnership had not met up to his expectations, and Bourdais would be replaced as of the Hungarian Grand Prix. Bourdais was advised by counsel to file suit for breach of contract by Toro Rosso, as he had a viable case. Toro Rosso settled the matter with a $2.1 million payment to Bourdais to avoid  litigation.

24 Hours of Le Mans

Bourdais has frequently contested the famous 24-hour race of his hometown, entering for the first time in 1999 (aged only 20) in a Porsche 911 GT2 run by Larbre Compétition. The car, which he shared with Pierre de Thoisy and Jean-Pierre Jarier, retired after 134 laps with engine failure.

He returned in 2000, finishing fourth with Emmanuel Clérico and Olivier Grouillard for the Pescarolo team behind the three dominant Audis.

His next three appearances did not go so well. He shared a Courage C60 with Jean-Christophe Boullion and Laurent Rédon in 2001 but it retired after 271 laps. He drove the same model the next year and finished ninth in the LMP900 class with Bouillon and Franck Lagorce. He missed the 2003 race and returned in 2004, only for the car he shared with Nicolas Minassian and Emmanuel Collard to retire after 282 laps.

Bourdais' next assault on Le Mans would come at the wheel of a factory-backed Peugeot 908 HDi FAP in 2007. The car he shared with Stéphane Sarrazin and Pedro Lamy finished the race second behind the winning Audi R10 TDi, despite an embarrassing slide on the first lap in wet conditions that cost Bourdais a place to one of the Audis, and car problems forcing him to park the car for the last minutes of the race, waiting for the lead R10 to cross the line. In his second Le Mans as part of the Peugeot factory team, in 2009, he finished in second place, one lap behind the winning Peugeot. Bourdais was to drive the pole-winning No. 3 Peugeot in 2010, but a suspension failure halted co-driver Pedro Lamy before Bourdais could turn one lap in the race.

Superleague Formula
After leaving Formula One, Bourdais signed up to drive the Sevilla FC car in the Superleague Formula series. He won on his debut weekend at the 2009 Estoril round in the Super Final. Bourdais won again at the next round, winning race 1 of the 2009 Monza round. He returned for the 2010 season racing for Olympique Lyonnais.

Sports and touring car racing career
While racing in the junior formulae and Champ Cars, Bourdais made several appearances in other championships. He won the Spa 24 Hours in 2002 with Christophe Bouchut, David Terrien and Vincent Vosse in a Larbre Compétition Chrysler Viper GTS-R. He also won his class at the 2006 12 Hours of Sebring in a Panoz Esperante. In 2005 he also competed in the International Race of Champions, winning his first stock car race at Texas Motor Speedway. In 2009, he set the official lap record at Sebring International Raceway, during the 12 Hours of Sebring.  In 2010, Bourdais raced with Scott Tucker, Christophe Bouchut, Emmanuel Collard and Sascha Maassen for Crown Royal in a Level 5 Motorsports prepared Daytona Prototype in the prestigious Rolex 24 at Daytona, held at Daytona International Speedway in Florida.  Bourdais recorded incredibly fast laps before the car retired due to an engine failure with Collard at the wheel.

In October 2010, Bourdais drove with Jonathon Webb in the Mother Racing Ford Falcon V8 Supercar in the Gold Coast 600. In October 2011, Bourdais drove with Jamie Whincup in the Team Vodafone Holden Commodore V8 Supercar in the Gold Coast 600, winning Saturday's opening race and finishing second in the second race landed Bourdais the inaugural Dan Wheldon Memorial Trophy, awarded to the international driver who scored the most points over the Gold Coast weekend. Wheldon had been set to contest the event but lost his life in the 2011 IndyCar season finale just a week earlier. Winning the V8 Supercar race meant that he is the only driver to have won a race at the Surfers Paradise Street Circuit in both Champcar/Indycar, as well as V8 Supercar. He has also participated in the Bathurst 1000 once, finishing ninth with Lee Holdsworth in 2015.

In July 2012, Bourdais won the inaugural Brickyard Grand Prix Rolex Sports Car Series race at Indianapolis Motor Speedway, teaming with Alex Popow in the No. 2 Starworks Motorsport Riley-Ford Daytona Prototype. In October, Bourdais teamed up again with Jamie Whincup in the Team Vodafone Holden Commodore V8 Supercar for the Gold Coast 600, again taking the victory on Saturday and scoring enough points on Sunday to win the event. This also awarded him the Dan Wheldon Memorial Trophy for the second time.

He won the Rolex 24 at Daytona in 2014 in the Action Express Corvette DP with João Barbosa and Christian Fittipaldi. In 2015 he finished second at the 24 Hours of Daytona and claimed the win at the 12 Hours of Sebring, both with an Action Express Corvette DP.

On 22 November 2019, the day it was announced he had lost his IndyCar series ride, Bourdais was announced as one of the drivers for the No. 5 Mustang Sampling Racing/JDC-Miller Motorsports entry, alongside Joao Barbosa.

IndyCar career

Bourdais made his IRL debut at the 2005 Indianapolis 500. In his first full-time season in the IRL (2011) with Dale Coyne, Bourdais wound up 23rd in the championship, scoring the fastest race lap at Edmonton.

A switch to Dragon Racing Team for 2012–13, first with the ill-fated Lotus, then with improved Chevrolet power, he finished 25th and 12th, respectively, in the IndyCar championship. By 2014, Bourdais broke through for two pole positions and one victory. By midpoint in the 2015 season, his second year driving for Jimmy Vasser's KV Racing team alongside teammate Stefano Coletti, Bourdais's stock steadily rose, to top 20 status in the world drivers' ranking.

On 20 July 2014, having won the 1st heat race in Toronto, Sébastien Bourdais joined Al Unser Jr. and Ryan Hunter-Reay as the third driver in the history of organised motorsport to score open-wheel Championship Racing victories, under three sanctioning bodies (e.g., CART, and CCWS, and IRL sanction), in North America. Against stiff opposition, Bourdais finished 2014 scoring 5 top-5s and 10th overall in the 2014 IRL championship.

On 31 May 2015, in the second heat race at Belle Isle, Detroit, in a drive from far back on the grid harkening back to Stefan Bellof at Monaco in 1984, effortlessly carving his way by lesser drivers on a tight, composite street circuit, in heavy rain, breaking through with an impressive, high-profile victory and fastest race lap, Bourdais recorded his 33rd victory in American Championship car racing, just behind Al Unser Jr. with 34.

On 12 July 2015, at the Milwaukee Mile, Bourdais dominated the field and had the entire field a lap down at one point and won, his second of the 2015 season. He finished 10th in points. After KV Racing went down to one team for 2016, Bourdais struggled with a lone win again at Detroit. He finished in 14th in points for 2016. In October 2016, it was announced that Bourdais would make the change to Dale Coyne Racing to drive the number 18 for the 2017 season. His KVSH race engineer Olivier Boisson would also follow him to DCR.

In his first race back to DCR, Bourdais won the Firestone Grand Prix of St. Petersburg to start the 2017 season coming from last after a qualifying crash, on 12 March 2017. He backed this up with another recovery drive at the Long Beach race, starting from ninth and making an early rear wing change, to finish second, extending his lead in the series standings.

On 20 May 2017, Bourdais was involved in a single-car accident while qualifying for the Indianapolis 500. He suffered multiple fractures to his pelvis and a fracture to his right hip. The surgery was successful but Bourdais was forced to sit out for most of the season to recover. Bourdais would return at Gateway and run the final three races of the season.

In 2018, Bourdais returned to the Dale Coyne Racing Team now partnered with investors James "Sulli" Sullivan and former driver Jimmy Vasser as Dale Coyne Racing with Vasser Sullivan. The team also found steady sponsorship in the form of SealMaster and SportClips Haircuts. Bourdais started The Firestone St. Petersburg Grand Prix in 14th place. He ended up losing a tire on the opening lap but the misfortunes of Will Power and Tony Kanaan saved him from going a lap down. He went on an off sequence pit strategy and found himself 3rd with a handful of laps to go. On the final restart, Alexander Rossi divebombed the first corner and got his tires locked up on the slick airport runway paint and got into race leader Robert Wickens who had led 67 laps that day and Bourdais snuck by to win. It was his first win since last year at St. Petersburg and his first since the injury. Bourdais was emotional in victory lane and said "he never doubted that he would run in IndyCar again". Bourdais went on to win pole at the very next race in Phoenix, his first on an oval since 2006. Bourdais was also the only driver to lead laps at each of the first four races of the 2018 Verizon IndyCar Series season.

On 22 November 2019, Dale Coyne Racing announced that Bourdais would not return to the team in 2020.

On 4 February 2020, it was announced that Bourdais joined A. J. Foyt Racing to drive part-time in the 2020 IndyCar Series season, running the races at St. Petersburg, Barber Motorsports Park, Long Beach and Portland. He finished fourth in the rescheduled St. Petersburg finale, an effort that kept the entry in the Leaders' Circle program for 2021. On 15 September, Bourdais was confirmed as a full-time driver for Foyt in 2021. At the season finale at Long Beach Bourdais announced that 2021 would be his last year competing full time in the IndyCar Series and that he intended to focus his efforts on sports car racing in the future. Bourdais however did not rule out racing in a select number of IndyCar events in 2022 and beyond, including the Indianapolis 500.

Other racing
In 2005, Bourdais competed in the 29th season of the International Race of Champions, racing stock cars against a field of 12 drivers from 8 different US-based racing series, winning 1 race in the 4 race season and finishing 5th in the overall standings.

Motorsports career results

Career summary

Notes
  Includes points scored by other Sevilla FC drivers.
  Includes points scored by other Olympique Lyonnais drivers.
* Season still in progress.

Complete International Formula 3000 results
(key) (Races in bold indicate pole position; races in italics indicate fastest lap)

American open–wheel racing results
(key)

CART/Champ Car

 ^ New points system introduced in 2004

IndyCar Series
(key)

Indianapolis 500

Complete Formula One results
(key)

† Did not finish the race but was classified as he completed more than 90% of the race distance.

Superleague Formula results
(key) (Races in bold indicate pole position; races in italics indicate fastest lap)

Sports car racing

Le Mans 24 Hours results

American Le Mans Series results

 1 Driver competed for the Intercontinental Le Mans Cup, no points awarded for the American Le Mans Series.

Le Mans Series results

 1 Driver competed for the Intercontinental Le Mans Cup, no points awarded for the Le Mans Series.

Intercontinental Le Mans Cup results

 1 Driver did not run for the Intercontinental Le Mans Cup.

FIA World Endurance Championship results

* Season still in progress.

24 Hours of Daytona results

Grand-Am Rolex Sports Car Series results
(key) (Races in bold indicate pole position, Results are overall/class)

† Bourdais did not complete sufficient laps to score points

Series Summary

Complete IMSA SportsCar Championship results
(key) (Races in bold indicate pole position; races in italics indicate fastest lap)

* Season still in progress.

Touring car racing

V8 Supercar results

† Not eligible for points

Complete Bathurst 1000 results

International Race of Champions

Notes

External links

Sébastien Bourdais at Driver Database
Sébastien Bourdais at IndyCar.com

Living people
1979 births
Sportspeople from Le Mans
French racing drivers
WeatherTech SportsCar Championship drivers
French Formula One drivers
Toro Rosso Formula One drivers
24 Hours of Le Mans drivers
24 Hours of Daytona drivers
Indianapolis 500 drivers
IndyCar Series drivers
Champ Car champions
Champ Car drivers
French Formula Three Championship drivers
International Formula 3000 Champions
French Formula Renault 2.0 drivers
International Formula 3000 drivers
Superleague Formula drivers
American Le Mans Series drivers
European Le Mans Series drivers
International Race of Champions drivers
Supercars Championship drivers
Rolex Sports Car Series drivers
FIA World Endurance Championship drivers
24 Hours of Spa drivers
12 Hours of Sebring drivers
La Filière drivers
Larbre Compétition drivers
Pescarolo Sport drivers
DAMS drivers
Super Nova Racing drivers
Newman/Haas Racing drivers
Multimatic Motorsports drivers
Peugeot Sport drivers
Dale Coyne Racing drivers
Dragon Racing drivers
Starworks Motorsport drivers
KV Racing Technology drivers
Action Express Racing drivers
Chip Ganassi Racing drivers
JDC Motorsports drivers
A. J. Foyt Enterprises drivers
Level 5 Motorsports drivers
Formule Campus Renault Elf drivers